The men's 110 metres hurdles event at the 2015 Summer Universiade was held on 10 and 11 July at the Gwangju Universiade Main Stadium.

Medalists

Results

Heats
Qualification: First 2 in each heat (Q) and next 2 fastest (q) qualified for the final.

Wind:Heat 1: +1.0 m/s, Heat 2: +0.3 m/s, Heat 3: -0.4 m/s

Final
Wind: +0.7 m/s

References

110
2015